Barsais a Tulu language film directed by Devadas Kapikad, Starring Arjun Kapikad, Kshama Shetty, Aravind Bolar, Bhojaraj Vamanjoor, in lead roles. The movie was produced by Sharmila Kapikad, Mukhesh Hegde and Swapna Kini under the banner of Bolli Movies.

Plot 
Prithvi who falls in love with Swathi at young age. Later he leaves town and comes back after 14 years. What happens next is what you have to see in cinemas. Film narrates story of persecution of the land mafia don.

Cast 
 Arjun Kapikad
 Kshama Shetty
 Bhojaraj Vamanjoor
 Aravind Bolar
 Thimmappa Kulal

Soundtrack

The soundtrack of the film was composed by Devadas Kapikad and background score by Manikanth Kadri. The soundtrack album was released on 3 Sept 2016 with the Anand Audio acquiring the audio rights.

References

Indian action films
2016 films